Cleethorpes Town F.C. was an English association football club from the town of Cleethorpes in Lincolnshire.

History
The club was founded in 1884 and played at the Highgate ground on Cleethorpes High Street.  It first entered the Lincolnshire Senior Cup in 1885-86, losing 4-1 in the first round at Gainsborough Trinity.

Its first entry to the FA Cup was in 1886-87, the club recovering from conceding an early goal to beat Mellors 2-1.  In the second round the club was well beaten by Lockwood Brothers at home.

The following season the club drew the professional side Grimsby Town at home.  The Mariners offered £7 to switch the tie to Grimsby, but Cleethorpes refused.  Grimsby therefore arranged a home match for the reserves on the same day, against Kiveton Park, and sent the first team to Cleethorpes.  The crowd was only a couple of hundred and Grimsby won both matches 4-0, so the Cleethorpes gamble of a big home gate did not come off.

One of the club's players, Charles Colbeck, was present at the Grimsby Town against Staveley F.C. match in which William Cropper of Staveley died of injuries after a collision with Daniel Doyle, and gave evidence at the inquest.

The club did not reach the national rounds of the Cup again; the furthest it reached was the fifth and penultimate qualifying round in 1919-20, losing to Castleford Town.  It never rose above the status of local leagues, withdrawing from the Grimsby League in 1905 after a match with Grimsby All Saints that ended in extreme acrimony, including one Cleethorpes player removing the goalposts so the game could not finish.

Although the club was playing matches up to the outbreak of World War 2, the club did not operate during the war itself, and did not re-start on the declaration of peace.  There was a brief resurrection in the 1960s of the club before another club chose the name in 2005.

Colours

The club's colours were cardinal shirts and white shorts.

References

Defunct football clubs in England
Association football clubs established in the 19th century